Henry Gifford  (died 1592), of King's Somborne, Hampshire, was an English politician.

He was a Member (MP) of the Parliament of England for Stockbridge in 1572.

His sister Katherine (d. 1599) married Sir Henry Wallop.

Marriage and children
He married Susan Brouncker, a daughter of Henry Brouncker of Erlestoke, Wiltshire. Their children included:
 John Gifford (d. 1597)
 Richard Gifford (1577-1643)
 Bridget Gifford, married Mr Powlett.

References

Year of birth missing
1592 deaths
English MPs 1572–1583
Politicians from Hampshire